Akbota Kalimzhanova (born 3 March 1993) is a Kazakhstani rhythmic gymnast.

She competed at the 2010 World Rhythmic Gymnastics Championships, 2011 World Rhythmic Gymnastics Championships, and 2013 World Rhythmic Gymnastics Championships.

References

External links 
 Kalimzhanova Akbota, hoop. Kazakhstan - Cup champions Gazprom - 2012 Grand Prix qualification, YouTube

Kazakhstani rhythmic gymnasts
1993 births

Living people
20th-century Kazakhstani women
21st-century Kazakhstani women